The Statute Law Revision Act 1888 (51 & 52 Vict c 3) is an act of the Parliament of the United Kingdom, a Statute Law Revision Act repealing all or part of various earlier acts of Parliament.

Provisions
The act included a Schedule in three Parts listing earlier acts of Parliament:
 Part I was a long list of acts in which the 1888 act removed the enacting formula from later sections, preserving for each act only a single enacting formula before its first section. This concise style had been usual for new acts of Parliament for several decades; Hardinge Giffard, Baron Halsbury said the deletions would lessen by 60 pages the size of the first volume of the revised edition of the statutes.
 Part II listed 15 acts, some of which had the same deletion of enacting formulae as in Schedule I, but all of which had miscellaneous other repeals.
 Part III listed 8 acts regulating criminal proceedings, which were obsolete except as regards prosecuting outlawry at assizes. These acts would be repealed in toto if and when the Lord Chancellor decided to extend to the courts of assize the 1886 High Court of Justice rules for proceedings in outlawry.

Later history
Parts I and II of the Schedule were repealed by the Statute Law Revision Act 1908.

No order was made under the 1888 act which would have repealed the Schedule Part III statutes; instead they were all repealed in the UK by the Administration of Justice (Miscellaneous Provisions) Act 1938, which abolished all outlawry proceedings.

The rest of the act was repealed in the UK by the Statute Law (Repeals) Act 1989, but retained in the Republic of Ireland by the Statute Law Revision Act 2007.

References
Halsbury's Statutes

United Kingdom Acts of Parliament 1888
March 1888 events